Thomas Ryan Walkup (born December 30, 1992) is an American professional basketball player for Olympiacos of the Greek Basket League and the EuroLeague. He played college basketball for Stephen F. Austin State University. Walkup was named Southland Conference Player of the Year for two consecutive seasons (2015 and 2016). Before playing at the college level, he attended Deer Park High School in Deer Park, Texas. Walkup is a native of Pasadena, Texas.

High school career
Born in Pasadena, Texas, Walkup attended Deer Park High School in nearby Deer Park. He was a point guard in his junior season for the varsity basketball team and averaged 10.1 points, 5.0 blocks, 4.6 assists, and 1.9 steals per game. Walkup also earned all-district honors after helping the Deer finish the season with a 24–11 record. He also lifted them to a bi-district round victory at the Class 5A playoffs. As a senior, Walkup averaged 25.9 points and 8.9 rebounds with Deer Park. In his years with the school, he faced two ACL injuries and a broken foot.

In November 2010, Walkup committed to play college basketball at Stephen F. Austin State University for the Lumberjacks. He chose the school because he aspired to compete in the NCAA Division I tournament and they ran a successful program. Houston Baptist was the only other school that offered him a scholarship. Walkup later said, "There was a reason I didn’t have any other scholarship offers besides those two—I wasn't any good." His father commented on Walkup's recruitment, "I'm sure scouts looked at him and said, 'Well, he's a 6–4 white guy and he can't shoot and he plays the four. And we don't need that.'"

College career
Walkup immediately assumed a big role with the Lumberjacks as the team's sixth man during his freshman season. In 18.5 minutes per game, he averaged 4.4 points and 3.6 rebounds. He recorded a season-best 11 points twice, against Tulsa on November 24, 2012, and versus McNeese State on January 5, 2013. That season, the Lumberjacks won a school-record 27 games, winning their third Southland Conference title of all-time and qualifying for the National Invitation Tournament (NIT).

As a junior at Stephen F. Austin, Walkup averaged 15.5 points and 6.5 rebounds per game. His teammates began referring to him as "The Snake", after establishing his ability for rebounds, consistently drawing fouls for opposing players, and providing scrappy defense for the Lumberjacks. He was named Southland Conference Player of the Year in 2015.

In the first round of the 2016 NCAA Tournament, Walkup scored 33 points in a 70–56 upset over third-seeded West Virginia. He shot 19-for-20 on free throws.

Professional career
After going undrafted in the 2016 NBA draft, Walkup joined the Golden State Warriors for the 2016 NBA Summer League. On September 26, 2016, he signed with the Chicago Bulls. However, he was later waived by the Bulls on October 21 after appearing in four preseason games. On October 30, he was acquired by the Windy City Bulls of the NBA Development League as an affiliate player of Chicago.

On August 10, 2017, Walkup signed with MHP Riesen Ludwigsburg of the German Basketball Bundesliga for the 2017–18 season. In April 2018, he was named to the All-German BBL First Team. On June 21, 2018, Walkup signed with Žalgiris Kaunas of the Lithuanian Basketball League. Walkup received the LKL Defensive Player of the Year Award in 2019. On 27 November 2019, Walkup extended his contract with Žalgiris until the summer of 2021.

On June 11, 2021, he officially signed a three-year contract with Greek club Olympiacos of the EuroLeague.

Awards and accomplishments

Club career 
Žalgiris Kaunas
 3× Lithuanian LKL Champion (2019, 2020, 2021)
 2x King Mindaugas Cup Winner (2020, 2021)
Olympiacos
 Greek League Champion: (2022)
 2×  Greek Cup Winner (2022, 2023)
  Greek Super Cup Winner (2022)

Individual
 2× AP Honorable Mention All-American (2015, 2016)
 2× Southland Player of the Year (2015, 2016)
 2× First-team All-Southland (2015, 2016)
 3× Southland tournament MVP (2014, 2015,  2016)
 Lou Henson Award (2016)
 All-German BBL First Team (2018)
 German BBL All-Star (2018) 
 Eurobasket.com's  All-German BBL Defensive Team (2018)
 LKL Finals MVP (2021) 
 2× LKL Best Defender (2019, 2021)
 Greek League Best Defender (2022)
 All-Greek League Defensive Team (2022)
Greek League All-Star (2022)

Career statistics

EuroLeague

|-
| style="text-align:left;"| 2018–19
| style="text-align:left;"| Žalgiris
| 34 || 18 || 16.4 || .485 || .295 || .806 || 2.6 || 2.2 || .5 || .0 || 5.2 || 5.6
|- class="sortbottom"
| style="text-align:left;"| Career
| style="text-align:left;"|
| 34 || 18 || 16.5 || .485 || .295 || .806 || 2.6 || 2.2 || .5 || .0 || 5.2 || 5.6

Personal life
Walkup was born on December 30, 1992, to Lisa and Raymond Walkup and was brought up in Pasadena, Texas. He has an older brother named Nathan who played as a forward for the Texas A&M Aggies men's basketball team from the 2007–08 season to 2010–11 season. Both players graduated at Deer Park High School and played under Coach Louis Means. Walkup has often been known for his beard, which drew the attention of several media outlets during the 2016 NCAA Tournament. Entering that year's tournament, he had not shaved since November 1, 2015. Walkup claimed that he had been asked to shave it, but he felt that it fit in with Stephen F. Austin's mascot, the Lumberjacks. His appearance has also been compared with Philadelphia Phillies baseball player Bryce Harper. He has also been nicknamed "Fresh Cut" by Barry Knight.

References

External links
 Stephen F. Austin Lumberjacks bio

1992 births
Living people
American expatriate basketball people in Germany
American expatriate basketball people in Lithuania
American expatriate basketball people in Greece
American men's basketball players
Basketball players from Texas
BC Žalgiris players
Riesen Ludwigsburg players
People from Pasadena, Texas
Shooting guards
Small forwards
Sportspeople from Harris County, Texas
Stephen F. Austin Lumberjacks basketball players
Windy City Bulls players